Chongsŏng station is a railway station in Chongsŏng-rodongjagu, Onsŏng County, North Hamgyŏng, North Korea, on the Hambuk Line of the Korean State Railway; it is also the starting point of the 15.6 km-long branchline to Tongp'o.

History
It was opened by the Tomun Railway in 1922, together with the rest of the Sangsambong–Chongsŏng section of their line (Hoeryŏng–Tonggwanjin), which on 1 April 1929 was nationalised and became the West Tomun Line of the Chosen Government Railway, and from 1934 to 1940 it was managed by the South Manchuria Railway.  Finally, after the partition of Korea it became part of the Korean State Railway.

References

Railway stations in North Korea
Railway stations opened in 1920